Title 46 of the United States Code outlines the role of shipping in the United States Code.

 Subtitle I: General
 Subtitle II: Vessels and Seamen
 Subtitle III: Maritime Liability 
 Subtitle IV: Regulation of Ocean Shipping 
 Subtitle V: Merchant Marine 
 Subtitle VI: Clearance, Tonnage Taxes, and Duties 
 Subtitle VII: Security and Drug Enforcement 
Chapter 701: Port Security 
Chapter 703: Maritime Security 
Chapter 705: Maritime Drug Law Enforcement
 Subtitle VIII: Miscellaneous
Chapter 801: Wrecks and Salvage		
Chapter 803: Ice and Derelicts	
Chapter 805: Safe Containers for International Cargo

External links
U.S. Code Title 46, via United States Government Printing Office
U.S. Code Title 46, via Cornell University

46
Title 46